Anton Tanghe (born 28 January 1999) is a Belgian professional footballer who plays for Oostende as a centre-back.

Club career
Tanghe is a youth product of Club Brugge, and signed with Oostende in the summer of 2019. He made his professional debut for Oostende in a 2–1 Belgian First Division A loss to Standard Liège on 24 January 2020.

References

External links

1999 births
Living people
People from Menen
Belgian footballers
Footballers from West Flanders
Association football defenders
Belgium youth international footballers
Belgian Pro League players
K.V. Oostende players